Clymenia is a genus in the ammonoid order Clymeniida, restricted to the Upper Devonian, characterized as with all clymeniids by a dorsal siphuncle that runs along the inside of the whorls, unusual for ammonoids.

Clymenia has a closely coiled evolute shell that may be faintly ribbed. The dorsum, on the inside of the whorl, is slightly impressed, a result of the outermost whorl slightly enveloping the previous. The venter may be rounded or acute. The suture is simple, with a broad ventral saddle, broad lateral lobe, a dorso-lateral saddle, and a moderately deep hidden dorsal lobe. Septal necks are usually short and do not form a continuous tube. The suture and siphuncle are characteristic of the family.

Clymenia is type genus of the family Clymeniidae. Is fossils have been found in Europe and Western Australia.

References
Notes

Bibliography
 Rocks, Minerals & Fossils of the World by Chris Pellant and Roger Phillips
 Treatise on Invertebrate Paleontology, Part L Ammonoidea; Geological Society of America and Univ of Kansas Press, 1964

Late Devonian ammonites
Ammonites of Australia
Ammonite genera
Clymeniina